Theilade is a Danish surname. Notable people with this surname include:

 Ida Theilade, Danish botanist
 Nini Theilade (1915–2018), Danish ballet dancer, choreographer and teacher